Sha Kok Mei is a village in Sai Kung Peninsula, Hong Kong.

Administration
Sha Kok Mei, including Ngau Liu, is a recognized village under the New Territories Small House Policy.

History
At the time of the 1911 census, the population of Sha Kok Mei was 346. The number of males was 152.

References

Further reading

External links

 Delineation of area of existing village Sha Kok Mei (Sai Kung) for election of resident representative (2019 to 2022)
 Antiquities Advisory Board. Historic Building Appraisal. Yuk Yin Study Hall, No. 1A Sha Kok Mei Second Lane, Sai Kung Pictures

Sai Kung Peninsula
Villages in Sai Kung District, Hong Kong